Eric Wayne Davis (born January 26, 1968) is a former professional American football player who was drafted by the San Francisco 49ers in the second round of the 1990 NFL draft. Davis played in 13 NFL seasons from 1990 to 2002. He played college football at Jacksonville State. In October 2008, he was elected to the Division II College Hall of Fame.  In May 2013, he was inducted into the Alabama Sports Hall of Fame.

College career

Davis played for Jacksonville State, which was at the time a Division II school, from 1986 to 1989.  As a senior, he led the team to a 13-1 record, a Gulf South Conference championship, and an appeareance in the Division II championship game.  He finished 1989 with 51 tackles, 8 pass deflections, and 6 interceptions.  He was voted into the school's athletic hall of fame in 1999.

NFL career
Davis is the all-time leader in consecutive NFL playoff games (five) with at least one interception.

Davis was a pivotal player in the 1994 NFC Championship Game versus the Dallas Cowboys when he made two key plays early in the game: a 44-yard interception return for a touchdown on the game's third play from scrimmage and a forced fumble on Michael Irvin that led to another 49ers touchdown. These plays helped the 49ers beat the previous two-time champion Cowboys to advance to Super Bowl XXIX. The 49ers went on to beat the San Diego Chargers 49–26. In 1995, Davis went to the Pro Bowl and helped the 49ers be the number-one ranked defense.

In 1996, he became a free agent and signed with the Carolina Panthers, helping them reach the NFC title game only to lose to eventual Super Bowl XXXI champion Green Bay Packers. After playing for one year (2001) with the Denver Broncos, in 2002, he ended his career with the Detroit Lions.

Broadcasting career
In the 2000s, Davis worked as a color analyst for the 49ers during the preseason on KPIX-TV, and also analyzed on Comcast SportsNet Bay Area. In 2011, he was hired as the color analyst for the 49ers radio broadcasts, joining Ted Robinson in the booth, and replacing Gary Plummer. He was also the cohost of "The Drive with Tierney and Davis" on 95.7 The Game in San Francisco.

In 2012, he became a cohost/analyst for a new weekday morning show on NFL Network titled NFL AM. He continued to serve as the 49ers' radio analyst through the 2013 season.

In 2015, he became a regular contributor on The Rich Eisen Show while moving to The NFL Network’s flagship program Total Access.  In 2016 he became cohost on the afternoon drive show at ESPN LA.

In 2017 Davis was accused of sexual assault and sexual misconduct by two makeup artists while Davis was working on Total Access. Davis was terminated from both ESPN and The NFL Network following the accusations.

In 2019 he became cohost of Bleav in 49ers Podcast.

In 2020 he was cleared of all sexual harassment allegations with all claims being dismissed With Prejudice in Los Angeles County Superior Court.

References 

1968 births
Living people
Sportspeople from Anniston, Alabama
African-American sports announcers
African-American sports journalists
American football cornerbacks
American football safeties
Jacksonville State Gamecocks football players
San Francisco 49ers players
Carolina Panthers players
Denver Broncos players
Detroit Lions players
National Conference Pro Bowl players
San Francisco 49ers announcers
College football announcers
National Football League announcers
Journalists from Alabama
Ed Block Courage Award recipients